Reunion Day can refer to:

Act Zluky - a public holiday in Ukraine sometimes translated as "Reunion Day"
Reunion Day (Denmark) - a public holiday in Denmark
Reunion Day (film) - a 1962 British TV movie
Class reunion - a meeting of former classmates

See also
Reunification Day - a public holiday in Vietnam
German Unity Day - a public holiday in Germany marking reunification
Réunion Island day gecko (Phelsuma borbonica) - a species of day gecko native to northern Réunion that is sometimes called the Réunion day gecko
Reunion (disambiguation)